Terrorizers is a 2021 Taiwanese romantic drama film directed by Ho Wi-ding and Hu Chih-Hsin, starring Austin Lin, Annie Chen, Ding Ning and .

Cast
 Austin Lin as Guo Ming Liang
  as Chen Yu Fang
 Annie Chen as Monica
  as Zhang Dong Ling
 Ding Ning as Lady Hsiao
  as Kiki

Release
The film premiered at the 2021 Toronto International Film Festival on 10 September 2021. The film was officially released in Taiwan on 19 November.

Reception
John Berra of Screen Daily wrote that the film "maintains interest throughout" while "emphasising some difficult truths about the human condition." Christy Deng of ELLE praised the performances of Austin Lin, Moon Lee, Annie Chen and J.C. Lin.

Cliff Lee of The Globe and Mail rated the film 2.5 stars out of 4.  criticised the film's usage of stereotypes of youths. HK01 criticised the script and felt that the characters were simply "tools".

References

External links
 
 

Taiwanese romantic drama films
2021 romantic drama films